The Electric Prunes, sometimes referred to as I Had Too Much to Dream (Last Night), is the 1967 debut album by the American garage rock band, the Electric Prunes, released on Reprise Records. The first track, "I Had Too Much to Dream (Last Night)", was a hit and became the band's signature tune. The album also contains another notable psychedelic rock composition, "Get Me to the World on Time". The album was listed in the book 1001 Albums You Must Hear Before You Die.

Background 
The success of the Electric Prunes' single, "I Had Too Much to Dream (Last Night)", which charted at number 11 in the U.S. and at number 49 in the UK, prompted the band to tour more and to record adverts. The band was featured in publicity photos for the November 1967 issue of Teen Pin-Ups. They also recorded an advert for the Vox wah-wah pedal and promoted use of the equipment in the Vox Teen Beat magazine. Following the band's extensive promotional campaign, a second single, "Get Me to the World on Time", was released and charted at number 27 in the U.S.

With the band having a busy touring schedule, the recording of the album was hurried in an effort to cash in on their recent success. The band was already composing material for what they hoped would be an album of their own design. However, much of the album's content was out of their control, as producer Dave Hassinger brought in the songwriting team of Annette Tucker and Nancie Mantz. They, alone, produced seven of the 12 tracks, much to the frustration of the band. Mark Tulin and James Lowe, the band's main songwriters, were limited to just one track, the song "Luvin'". The band considered some of the tracks to be filler and were disappointed in not having a choice in disclosing them. Tulin stated, "We had nothing resembling freedom, let alone total freedom, in the selection of our songs. Consequently, there are definitely songs that I do believe didn't belong on the album..."

The album was released in April 1967 and charted with moderate success at number 113 on the Billboard 200.

Track listing
Adapted from AllMusic.

Personnel
The Electric Prunes
James Lowe – lead vocals (tracks 1, 2, 5–14), autoharp, rhythm guitar, tambourine
Ken Williams – lead guitar
James "Weasel" Spagnola – rhythm guitar, backing vocals, lead vocals (tracks 3, 4)
Mark Tulin – bass guitar, piano, organ
Preston Ritter – drums, percussion

Technical
Dave Hassinger – producer, liner notes
Richie Podolor – engineer
Bill Cooper – assistant engineer
Perry Botkin Jr. – string and brass arrangements
Ed Thrasher – art director
Jane McCowan – photography

References

The Electric Prunes albums
1967 debut albums
Reprise Records albums